Victorian Gardens was a seasonal traditional-style amusement park that is set up at Wollman Rink in Central Park, Manhattan, New York City, from spring through fall each year.

Description
The  facility, which started operating in spring 2003, can accommodate up to 3,000 guests and features about a dozen rides which are geared primarily to ages 2–12.  The rides include the "Family Swinger", "Samba Balloon", "Aeromax", "Convoy", "Rockin' Tug", "Kite Flyer", "Fun Slide", "HydroRacer" and "Mini Mouse Coaster" among others.  In addition to the rides, the park offers activities including face painting, balloon sculpting, interactive games and live entertainment, including clowns and magic shows, on weekends and holidays.

Entertainment
Every weekend various entertainers are known to perform live and interactive shows in which park guests of all ages can engage.

History
The idea to put an amusement park in the Wollman Rink came from a small group of industry veterans who saw an opportunity to use the 50,000 square foot facility all year long. After negotiations with the Central Park Conservancy, the New York City Parks Department and the Trump Organization, these private investors established Central Amusement International (CAI), which turned to Zamperla, an Italian amusement ride manufacturer, to make their vision a reality. Victorian Gardens first opened its gates to the general public in 2003.

Due to operating restrictions caused by the COVID-19 pandemic in New York City, Victorian Gardens did not open for the 2020 season. In August 2020, Victorian Gardens announced it was considering a permanent closure.

References

External links

Amusement parks in New York (state)
2003 establishments in New York City
Central Park
Entertainment venues in Manhattan